Atavistic regression is a hypnosis-related concept introduced by the Australian scholar and psychiatrist Ainslie Meares. Meares coined his term from the English atavism, which is derived from the Latin atavus, meaning a great-grandfather's grandfather and, thus, more generally, an ancestor.

As used by Meares, for example, his 1960 work A System of Medical Hypnosis, the term "atavistic regression" is used to denote the tendency to revert to ancestral type:
 "The atavistic hypothesis requires… a regression from normal adult mental function at an intellectual, logical level, to an archaic level of mental function in which the process of suggestion determines the acceptance of ideas. This regression is considered to be the basic mechanism in the production of hypnosis."

Meares held the view that when in hypnosis, the higher (more evolved) functions of the subject's brain were switched off, and the subject reverted to a far more archaic and far less advanced (in evolutionary terms) mental state; something which significantly altered the subjects' cognitive processing so that they readily accepted internally consistent, literal logic without any of the normal filters and verifications against the objective facts of the real world.

Later, Meares came to believe that it was the atavistic regression rather than the treatments that went with hypnosis that helped the patient. He concluded that the regression enabled the mind to rest and restored its equilibrium in a way that was analogous to sleep. On one hand people who did not spontaneously undergo this process became tense and unable to let their guard down. On the other hand, helping people to learn how to experience this state a couple of times a day seemed to facilitate mental coping which Meares believed was due to sufficient mental rest.

By this time he had completed a transition from hypnosis in which he took a large role to the smaller role of facilitator showing patients how to induce this state themselves. He referred to this regressed state by different names at different times  e.g.: relaxing meditative experience, relaxing mental exercise, deep relaxation, atavistic regression, mental ataraxis. Contemporary teachers of his method may refer to this as Stillness Meditation or Stillness Meditation Therapy, although some use other terms. Some other traditions use the term stillness meditation and these unrelated systems have little in common with Meares' method.

Notes

References 
 Meares, A., "A Dynamic Technique For The Induction Of Hypnosis", Medical Journal of Australia, Vol.I, No.18, (30 April 1955), pp. 644–646.
 Meares, A., "A Note on the Motivation for Hypnosis", Journal of Clinical and Experimental Hypnosis, Vol.III, No.4, (October 1955), pp. 222–228.
 Meares, A., "A Working Hypothesis as to the Nature of Hypnosis", Archives of Neurology and Psychiatry, Vol.77, (May 1957), pp. 549–555.
 Meares, A., "An Atavistic Theory of Hypnosis", pp. 73–103 in Kline, M.V. (ed.), The Nature of Hypnosis: Contemporary Theoretical Approaches, Transactions of the 1961 International Congress on Hypnosis, The Postgraduate Center for Psychotherapy and The Institute for Research in Hypnosis, (New York), 1962.
 Meares, A., "Atavistic Regression As A Factor In The Remission Of Cancer", Medical Journal of Australia, Vol.2 (1977), No.4, (23 July 1977), pp. 132–133.
 Meares, A., "On The Nature Of Suggestibility", British Journal of Medical Hypnotism, (Summer 1956), pp. 3–8.
 Meares, A., "Theories of Hypnosis", pp. 390–405 in Schneck, J.M. (ed.), Hypnosis in Modern Medicine (Third Edition), Charles C. Thomas, (Springfield), 1963.
 Meares, A., A System of Medical Hypnosis, Julian Press, (New York), 1960.
 Meares, A., Hypnography: A Study in the Therapeutic Use of Hypnotic Painting, Charles C. Thomas, (Springfield), 1957.

Hypnosis